Jawahar Navodaya Vidyalaya, West Champaran is a co-educational government residential school in Vrindavan village in West Champaran district in the Indian state of Bihar. It was established in 1986 by Navodaya Vidyalaya Samiti, a registered Society under Registration of Societies Act, 1860 and an autonomous body under the Department of School Education & Literacy, Ministry of Human Resource Development, Govt. of India. It is a C.B.S.E affiliated school primarily aims at identification and development of talented school children predominantly from rural areas who are denied good educational opportunities. The school provides reservation as per mandate of Govt. of India, at least 75% selection of students from rural areas, maximum 25% from urban areas and fixed 33% to girl students. The admission process goes through a district level entrance test called Jawahar Navodaya Vidyalaya Selection Test (JNVST)   to select 80 students out of total class V passed appearing students. The school provides lateral admission to very limited seats of students of class IX and class XI in class X and XII respectively. It provides boarding, lodging, and medical to students at nominal fee of 200 per month. The students belonging to SC, ST, and disabled categories including girl students and students below the poverty line are provided exemption from the fee.

Admissions
Admission to the Vidyalaya is based on an annual merit test, called the Jawahar Navodaya Vidyalaya Selection Test(JNVST), designed, developed and conducted by NCERT earlier and now by the CBSE, except lateral admissions in the class IX and XI to the very limited seats. The merit test is held annually apparently on the first Sunday in the month of February, at district level open to all students who have passed class V in the current year.

Facilities
It offers free education to talented children from Class VI to XII. It provides free boarding and lodging, expenses on uniforms, text books, stationery, and things of daily usage. However, a nominal fee 200 per month is charged from students of Class IX to XII in welfare of Vidyalaya called Vidyalaya Vikas Nidhi. The students belonging to Scheduled Caste, Scheduled Tribes, Physically handicapped category and families below the poverty line and all girls students excluding any category are relaxed from the fee.

Infrastructure and other facilities
 Separate hostel and mess for boys and girls.
 Sports ground, music rooms, classrooms and a library, with no membership required.
 Boarding, lodging, uniform, text-Books, stationary, free to students.
 Internet, Wi-Max connectivity.

Academic
The regional language is the default medium of learning from Class-VI to VIII, later it changes to English for Science and Mathematics and Hindi for Humanities subjects, particularly class IX onward.

Affiliation
The school is affiliated to the Central Board of Secondary Education, New Delhi (which conducts the CBSE exams in grades, i.e. classes 10 & 12).

Migration scheme
It offers migration scheme through which the inter-regional exchange of Hindi and Non-Hindi speaking students occurs between Vidyalayas situated in different States. It takes place for one academic year based on first come basis against very limited seats.

Photo gallery

See also
 Jawahar Navodaya Vidyalaya

References

External links
 Navodaya Vidyalaya Samiti Official Website

Schools in Bihar
Jawahar Navodaya Vidyalayas in Bihar
1986 establishments in Bihar
Educational institutions established in 1986
West Champaran district